The Tas-Kystabyt is a mountain range in the Sakha Republic and Magadan Oblast, Far Eastern Federal District, Russia. It is also known as "хребе́т Са́рычева" —Sarychev Range, in honor of 19th century Russian cartographer Admiral Gavril Sarychev.

Geography
The Tas-Kystabyt rises in the southeasternmost sector of the Chersky Range System. The range is bound by the upper Indigirka River valley and its tributary, the Nera River.

It separates the Oymyakon Plateau to the west from the Nera Plateau to the northeast. To the east it is bound by the Upper Kolyma Highlands and to the south it overlaps with the Suntar Khayata Range.

Flora

The lower slopes of the range are covered by sparse larch taiga. The higher elevations have only mountain tundra.

References

External links
The Tas-Kystabyt Magmatic Belt
A Contribution to the Liverwort Flora of the Upper Course of the Indigirka River

Mountain ranges of Magadan Oblast
Chersky Range
Mountain ranges of the Sakha Republic
pl:Tas-Kystabyt
ru:Тас-Кыстабыт
sah:Таас Кыстаабыт